The Anti-Corruption Commission of the Republic of Azerbaijan  is set up according to the article 4.2 of the Law of the Republic of Azerbaijan on "Fight Against Corruption" and functions as a specialized agency on combating corruption since 2005.

Commission is composed of 15 members. 5 members of the commission are appointed by the President of the Republic, 5 by the Parliament and the 5 by the Constitutional Court. The statute of it approved by the Law of Azerbaijan Republic dated May 3, 2005 defines the authorities of the commission.

Principal Objectives of the Commission 

Commission's main objectives are:

 to take part in formation of state policy in the area of combating corruption 
 to coordinate the activities of public institutions in this area 
 to supervise the implementation of the State Program on Combating Corruption 
 to analyse the state and efficiency of the struggle against corruption 
 to receive financial declarations envisaged in Section 5.1 of the law “On Combating Corruption" 
 to collect, analyse and summarize information regarding corruption related law violations 
 to make proposals to the appropriate public institutions 
 to cooperate with public and other institutions in the field of combating corruption 
 to receive complaints and applications from individuals

Authorities of the Commission

Commission in order to reach its objectives, shall vested with followings:

 to study and generalize the state of execution of the anti-corruption legislation and to hear the reports and information provided by the heads of the law enforcement and other state bodies;  
 to receive from state and local administrative bodies necessary information and materials;  
 to receive information on the state of the implementation of the State Program on Combating Corruption from the corresponding state bodies and analyses the state of the implemented works;  
 to prepare recommendations and proposals for increasing the efficiency of the combating corruption and elimination of the shortcomings in the field of combating corruption and take measures for their implementation;  
 to take measures for organization of public awareness in the area of combating corruption and conduction of public surveys  
 to cooperate with NGO's, mass-media, private sector representatives', independent experts and in case of necessity to involve them for the execution of certain tasks;  
 to take part in international cooperation for increasing the efficiency and organization of the struggle against corruption;  
 to send the materials for examination to the competent authority, shall it contain the constitutive elements of the corruption related offences,  
 to make proposals for the improvement of the anti-corruption legislation;

Commission shall have other authorities provided by the legislation.

Institutional framework 

There are working groups acting near the commission. The members of the working groups are representatives of state bodies, civil society, private sector and international organizations. Commission has its permanent Secretariat. Secretariat of the commission is a public body and the employees are civil servants.

The Secretariat carries out all organizational and analytical tasks related to work of the commission, coordinates the activities of working groups acting within the commission, conducts the public awareness about Commission's activities, sets the work with international organizations and provides clerical support to Commission's meetings. Secretariat also studies different aspects of the struggle against corruption, international experience, legislative basis of different countries and presents proposals to the commission.

Secretariat is in regular contact with media, independent experts and civil society representatives and involves them into realization of projects and events. Generally taken the structure of the Commission comprises the commission's Members, Permanent Secretariat and Working groups. Commission sets its activities in cooperation with state bodies, NGO's and international organizations. Commission regularly holds meetings dedicated to different subjects according to its Annual Action Plan.

The head of Secretariat is Mr. Kamal Jafarov.

Legal framework 

Commission was set up under the Law “On Combating Corruption”. Commission's statute was adopted by law. The statute of the Secretariat and regulations governing the activities of working groups were adopted by decrees of the commission.

References
The official page of the Commission on Combating Corruption

Presidential Administration of Azerbaijan

See also
 ASAN Service
 Corruption in Azerbaijan
 Open government in Azerbaijan
 Azerbaijan Anti-Corruption Academy
 Fuad Alasgarov
 İnam Karimov
 Vusal Huseynov

Law enforcement agencies of Azerbaijan
Anti-corruption agencies